Celtiberian Range (in Spanish language: Serranía Celtibérica), also called South Lapland or Spanish Lapland (Laponia del Sur or Laponia Española), is the geographical term given to a small part of Spain due to its lower population and lack of infrastructure.

Its nomenclature comes from the Celtiberians, a pre-Roman tribe who lived in this area long ago.

Geography 

It comprises an area of 63,098 km². Through the range are 1,632 municipalities among several provinces. All but the Valencian Community are landlocked.

It has a population of 503,566 inhabitants.

References 

Geography of Spain